Alexander Cleland (born 10 December 1970) is a Scottish professional football player and coach.

Cleland played as a defender for Scottish sides Rangers and Dundee United and English team Everton. Although never capped at senior level for Scotland, he did make eleven appearances for the under-21 team. After retiring from football, he moved into coaching, having two spells as caretaker boss at Livingston and twice at St Johnstone.

Playing career
Cleland started his career with Dundee United, signing as a youth player in 1986. He soon established himself in the reserve team and made his first team debut against Morton in April 1988. By 1990 he was a first team regular, but then broke a leg twice within a few months. After recovering, he was part of the Dundee United team that won the Scottish Cup in 1994. He signed for Rangers in a joint transfer with Gary Bollan in 1995 and established himself in the right-back position at Ibrox. After over 100 appearances for the Glasgow club, he joined Premier League side Everton along with manager Walter Smith in 1998; however, his time in England was blighted with constant injury problems, and he only made 44 appearances before retiring in 2002.

Coaching career
Cleland was assistant manager to Steve Morrison at East Stirlingshire before joining Partick Thistle in January 2004. On 21 June 2004, Cleland was appointed as youth coach at Livingston, taking over from Paul Hegarty who left to join Dunfermline Athletic.

Whilst at Livi he served as caretaker-manager role on two occasions, firstly after the dismissal of Allan Preston in November 2004. Cleland led the side to a 3–1 win away to Kilmarnock on 27 November, ended a seven-game losing run. Then following the sacking of John Robertson in April 2007 which ultimately led to him  leaving the club a month later when he failed to become permanent manager.

After leaving Livingston, Cleland coached part-time at Rangers in their Academy before being appointed youth coach at Inverness Caledonian Thistle in January 2008. Following their relegation, Cleland was released as a coach by Inverness Caledonian Thistle to cut costs but shortly afterwards took up a similar position at St Johnstone. He served as their caretaker manager in October 2011, after Derek McInnes and Tony Docherty left for Bristol City. In June 2018, Cleland was promoted to the position of assistant manager at St Johnstone. He was again put in caretaker charge of St Johnstone in May 2020, after the resignation of Tommy Wright.

Career statistics

Honours
Dundee United
 Scottish Cup: 1
 1993–94

Rangers
 Scottish Premier Division: 3
 1994-95, 1995–96, 1996–97
 Scottish Cup: 1
 1995–96
 Scottish League Cup: 1
 1996–97

References

External links 
 

1970 births
Living people
Footballers from Glasgow
Scottish footballers
Scottish football managers
Dundee United F.C. players
Rangers F.C. players
Everton F.C. players
Livingston F.C. managers
Premier League players
Scottish Football League players
Scotland B international footballers
Association football fullbacks
Livingston F.C. non-playing staff
Rangers F.C. non-playing staff
St Johnstone F.C. non-playing staff
Inverness Caledonian Thistle F.C.
Scotland under-21 international footballers